Sigatica carolinensis is a species of predatory sea snail, a marine gastropod mollusc in the family Naticidae, the moon snails.

Distribution

Description 
The maximum recorded shell length is 11 mm.

Habitat 
Minimum recorded depth is 11 m. Maximum recorded depth is 227 m.

References

External links

Naticidae
Gastropods described in 1889